Gorbatov is the name of several inhabited localities in Russia.

Urban localities
Gorbatov, Nizhny Novgorod Oblast, a town in Pavlovsky District of Nizhny Novgorod Oblast

Rural localities
Gorbatov, Rostov Oblast, a khutor in Bokovskoye Rural Settlement of Bokovsky District in Rostov Oblast